The Tunis Agenda for the Information Society was a consensus statement of the World Summit on the Information Society, adopted on November 18, 2005 in Tunis, Tunisia.  It called for the creation of the Internet Governance Forum and a novel, lightweight, multistakeholder governance structure for the Internet.

See also
Tunis Commitment

External links

Tunis Agenda for the Information Society

International Telecommunication Union